Heybət (also, Eibat) is a settlement in Baku, Azerbaijan.  The settlement forms part of the municipality of Lökbatan in Qaradağ raion.

References 

Populated places in Baku